T. rubra  may refer to:
 Thelymitra rubra, the salmon sun orchid, an orchid species endemic to southeastern Australia
 Tritonia rubra, a nudibranch species

Synonyms
 Tissa rubra, a synonym for Spergularia rubra, a plant species native of Malta, Sicily and Algiers

See also
 Rubra (disambiguation)